There are numerous video games based on the YuYu Hakusho manga and anime series created by Yoshihiro Togashi. The Japanese name of the series is romanized as Yū Yū Hakusho and the anime is officially titled Yu Yu Hakusho in North America. The games primarily revolve around the protagonist Yusuke Urameshi, a delinquent junior high school student who is killed while trying to save a young boy from being hit by a car. Yusuke is brought back to life and is promptly given the task of solving cases involving ghosts and demons in the human world.

There are a total of twenty-one video games based solely on YuYu Hakusho, most of have only been released in Japan. When the anime series aired on Fuji TV in the early 1990s, games were released on both home and handheld consoles. These include a group by Tomy on the Nintendo Game Boy, a group by Namco on the Super Famicom, releases on Sega consoles, and a few miscellaneous platform titles. In May 2003, following the show's western debut, Atari acquired the rights to distribute new YuYu Hakusho games in North America and PAL regions. The company published three games exclusive to those locations. More Japan-exclusive games have since been released by Banpresto and Takara Tomy. Games in the series are of several different genres, though many are action or fighting-themed in relation to the manga's story arcs.

Video games in the YuYu Hakusho franchise have achieved some commercial success. By December 2003, video games in the series had accrued $273 million in life-to-date retail sales. Atari reported adequate fiscal contributions from its releases in North America. Yū Yū Hakusho Forever for the PlayStation 2 also saw initial success on Japanese sales charts. However, games in the franchise that have been released since 2003 have received mostly poor to average reviews from critics.

Video games

1990s

2000s

2010s

Other games

References

External links
Yū Yū Hakusho Forever official website 
Yū Yū Hakusho DS: Ankoku Bujutsu Kai Hen official website 
The Battle of Yū Yū Hakusho: Shitō! Ankoku Bujutsu Kai official website 
The Battle of Yū Yū Hakusho: Shitou! Ankoku Bujutsu Kai 120% Full Power official website 

YuYu Hakusho
YuYu Hakusho
 
Yu Yu Hakusho (video game series)
Yu Yu Hakusho (video game series)